The Bread Peddler (French: La porteuse de pain, Italian: La portatrice di pane) is a 1950 French-Italian historical drama film directed by Maurice Cloche and starring Vivi Gioi,  Philippe Lemaire and Jean Tissier. It is an adaptation of the novel The Bread Peddler by Xavier de Montépin. It was made at the Cinecittà Studios in Rome.

Plot 
France, 1860. In Alfortville, a town near Paris, Eng. Labroue has founded a mechanical workshop where his inventions are exploited. The engineer is assisted in his work by the chief engineer Jacques Garaud, intelligent and ambitious. Jacques Garaud has an unrequited love for Jeanne Fortier, a young widow doorkeeper in the garage; Jeanne is the mother of two children: Georges, who lives with her mother, and Lucie, entrusted to a nurse. Jeanne, surprised by Eng. Labroue to light an oil lamp, an operation prohibited due to the risk of fires, is fired. Jacques Garaud plans to get rich by stealing the plans for a new machine designed by Eng. Labroue. Surprised by his master during the theft, Jacques kills him with a knife, sets fire to the workshop, makes believe that the fire was started by Jeanne and that he died charred. Jeanne is sentenced to life imprisonment and separated from her children.

In 1880 Jeanne escapes, goes to Paris, where she will work as a bread carrier calling herself Lise Perrin. Meanwhile, her two children are also in Paris, but both of them ignore their true identity: Georges, adopted by the painter Castel, has become a lawyer, Lucie is a seamstress. Jacques Garaud is also in Paris who, after assuming the identity of Paul Harmant and being widowed by a wealthy American, is now the owner of a factory run by Lucien Labroue, the son of Eng. Labroue assassinated in his time by Garaud. Garaud/Harmant has a cardiopathic daughter, Mary, who is in love with the young Lucien Labroue. Georges reconstructs his mother's legal case. Jacques Garaud is unmasked, daughter Mary dies of grief, Jeanne is finally reunited with her children, Lucie will marry Lucien Labroue.

Cast
Vivi Gioi	as Jeanne Fortier / Lise Perrin
Philippe Lemaire	as	Lucien Labroue
Jean Tissier	as 	Ovide Soliveau
Gabriel Cattand	as 	Georges Darier
Carlo Ninchi	as 	Jacques Garaud / Paul Harmant
Nicole Francis	as 	Lucie Fortier
Giulio Battiferri
Nino Bernardi	as 	Castel
Wanda Capodaglio
Jacky Flynt	as 	Amanda
Giovanna Galletti	as 	Madame Auguste
Irene Genna	as 	Marie Harmant
Franco Pesce
Georgette Tissier

See also
The Bread Peddler (1963, also directed by Maurice Cloche)

References

Bibliography 
 Goble, Alan. The Complete Index to Literary Sources in Film. Walter de Gruyter, 1999.

External links
 

1950 films
1950s historical drama films
French historical drama films
Italian historical drama films
1950s Italian-language films
Films directed by Maurice Cloche
Films set in the 19th century
Films based on The Bread Peddler
Films shot at Cinecittà Studios
Minerva Film films
1950 drama films
French black-and-white films
Italian black-and-white films
1950s Italian films
1950s French films